The 2009 Munster Senior Hurling Championship Final was a hurling match played on 12 July 2009 at Semple Stadium, Thurles, County Tipperary. It was contested by Tipperary and Waterford. Tipperary claimed their third Munster Championship of the decade, beating Waterford on a scoreline of 4–14 to 2–16, a 4-point winning margin. Overall, this was Tipperary's thirty eighth Munster Senior Hurling Championship.

Previous Munster Final encounters
Previous to this encounter, the teams had met each other in six Munster Hurling Finals, with Tipperary edging the rivalry with four wins in comparison to Waterford's two wins.  The most recent Munster Final involving both teams was in 2002 with Waterford winning on a scoreline of 2–23 to 3–12.  The match was notable for the fact that Waterford won their first Munster Championship in thirty nine years.

GAA 125th Anniversary
Special events were held in Thurles to mark the 125th anniversary of the GAA on the weekend of the match.  Most notable of these special events was a torch procession from the birthplace of Michael Cusack, Carran, County Clare to Hayes' Hotel in Thurles (founding place of the GAA). On the day of the match, the torch was brought from Hayes' Hotel to Semple Stadium. The torch was brought onto the pitch by former Tipperary hurler, Jimmy Doyle.

Team selection
Tipperary manager Liam Sheedy named an unchanged team from the semi final win over Clare for the Munster Senior Hurling Championship final clash with Waterford.  For Waterford, Tony Browne came in at wing-back for Richie Foley, Aidan Kearney took Kevin Moran's spot on the other wing. Moran moved to midfield to allow Stephen Molumphy switch to centre forward.

Match details

Post-match reaction
Waterfor manager Davy FitzGerald was unhappy with his teams defending before half time, "the goal before half-time, and the one after, were bad errors, mistakes we made, But fair play to Tipp, they were in control of the game for a lot of it. Tipp have been coming a long time. And they’ll be hard beaten. Their work ethic is very good. You can’t make mistakes and expect to win" he said.

Tipperary manager Liam Sheedy conceded that Waterford outhurled Tipperary for much of the Final, "We’re down to the last four and we’re delighted to be there, We have to be fair and honest, Waterford outhurled us for long patches and we were tipping the odd point here and there, Overall, we came here to win, we’ve won and we’re delighted to be back in Croke Park" he said.
Midfielder Shane McGrath claimed that Tipperary are a more rounded team than in 2008, "I think we're more of a team this year than last year - we train a lot harder, we've put in a lot more. We're a closer team, You don't win anything unless you're a close team and friends. At the end of the day, we're all friends and we'll all plug away for each other" he said.

References

External links
 Match details at Hurlingstats.com

Munster
Munster Senior Hurling Championship Finals
Tipperary GAA matches
Waterford GAA matches